Utilita Arena may refer to one of several indoor arenas in the United Kingdom which are, or have been, sponsored by Utilita Energy:

Utilita Arena Birmingham (2020–)
Utilita Arena Newcastle (2019–), unambiguously the Utilita Arena prior to 2020
Utilita Arena Sheffield (2021–)